Andalusian patios are central open spaces in the courtyard houses of the south of Spain. The stone patios are an architectural evolution of the Roman atrium.

Background
It has long been customary to decorate houses and palaces with large open spaces and gardens dominated by fragrant flowers, fountains, canals, wells, ponds, frescoes with mythological scenes, and marble medallions (on walls), forming ornate but harmonious shapes with the intention to represent the Garden of the Paradise as imagined by the Classical and Muslim architects.

There are countless examples throughout the region of Andalusia, notably in the historical quarter of Córdoba where "Fiesta of the patios" is celebrated. These patio houses are communal, family or multifamily dwellings or sets of individual houses with the shared patio. As a  characteristic cultural space boasts an abundant array of plants, and during the fiesta inhabitants can share food and wine, and freely welcome all visitors to admire their beauty and the skill involved in their creation. The patios also host traditional singing, flamenco guitar playing and dancing.

Architecture

As trends evolved, the addition of windows, fences (in wrought iron or wood), balconies and other viewpoints into the garden from inside the house became commonplace. Some of these were designed to give a view of the patio while obscuring the viewer from outside observers.

See also 
Terrace
Generalife
Sahn, the equivalent within the wider tradition of Muslim architecture.

References

Andalusian culture
History of Andalusia
Spanish gardens
Garden features
Buildings and structures in Andalusia